The 1933 Northern Ireland general election was held on 30 November 1933.  Like all previous elections to the Parliament of Northern Ireland, it produced a large majority for the Ulster Unionist Party. 33 of the 52 seats were uncontested, the largest number in the history of the House of Commons.

Results

|}

Electorate 793,952 (250,519 in contested seats); Turnout 67.7% (169,690). The sole member elected for Fianna Fáil was the President of the Executive Council (Prime Minister) of the Irish Free State, Éamon de Valera.

Seat changes

Votes summary

Seats summary

References
Northern Ireland Parliamentary Election Results 

1933
Northern Ireland general election
Northern Ireland general election
1933 elections in Northern Ireland